Vasylivka is a village in Odesa Raion, Odesa Oblast, Ukraine. It belongs to Vyhoda rural hromada, one of the hromadas of Ukraine. The current estimated population is 2068 (as of 2001).

History 
The village was founded in 1849. The Dubiecki Manor, located in the village, was built between 1830 and 1854. According to some data, architect Francesco Boffo, known for his work on Potemkin Stairs in Odesa, designed the building. The designer of the gardens, situated near by the manor, was architect Ivan Dallakva. The first owner was the noblemen major general Vasyl Dubiecki.

Until 18 July 2020, Vasylivka belonged to Biliaivka Raion. The raion was abolished in July 2020 as part of the administrative reform of Ukraine, which reduced the number of raions of Odesa Oblast to seven. The area of Biliaivka Raion was merged into Odesa Raion.

Notable people 
 Sergei Pankejeff, Russian aristocrat from Odesa best known for being a patient of Sigmund Freud, who gave him the pseudonym of Wolf Man (der Wolfsmann).

References

Sources 
 Одесская область может лишиться «Волчьего логова» — уникального памятника архитектуры 
 Путешествия Историей 
 Зимний дворец и Лувр под Одессой 

Villages in Odesa Raion
Populated places established in the Russian Empire